The Longwood Historic District is a U.S. historic district (designated as such on October 5, 1990) located in Longwood, Florida. The district is bounded by West Pine Avenue, South Milwee Street, Palmetto Avenue, and CR 427. The district contains 37 historic buildings, including the Bradlee-McIntyre House and the Longwood Hotel.

References

External links
 Seminole County listings at National Register of Historic Places

National Register of Historic Places in Seminole County, Florida
Historic districts on the National Register of Historic Places in Florida
1990 establishments in Florida
Longwood, Florida